Fitzroy is a surname, and may refer to:

 Cecil Fitzroy (1844–1917), New Zealand politician
 Edi Fitzroy (1955–2017), Jamaican reggae singer
 Emily Fitzroy (1860–1954), English actress in the USA
 Maurice Fitzroy, English cricketer
 Nancy Deloye Fitzroy (born 1927), American engineer